Robert Forman Horton (18 September 1855 – 1934), British Nonconformist divine, was born in London.

Early life and education
Horton was educated at Shrewsbury School and New College, Oxford, where he was awarded a First in classics. He was president of the Oxford Union in 1877. He became a fellow of his college in 1879, and lectured on history for four years. He was the first non-Anglican to have a teaching position at the Oxford University since the Reformation.

Church role
In 1880 Horton accepted an invitation to become pastor of the Lyndhurst Road Congregational Church, Hampstead, and subsequently took a very prominent part in church and denominational work. This included establishing a mission hall for the Hampstead church in Kentish Town, known as Lyndhurst Hall.

Horton delivered the Lyman Beecher lectures at Yale University in 1893. In 1898 he was chairman of the London Congregational Union, and in 1903 he was chair of the Congregational Union of England and Wales. In 1909 he took a prominent part in the 75th anniversary celebration of Hartford Theological Seminary.

His numerous publications spanned theological, critical, historical, biographical and devotional subjects.

Personal life 
Author Mary Beaumont was lifelong friends with Horton. Beaumont and her husband lived with Horton from 1902 until Beaumont's death in 1910.

Selected works
 The Courage of Conviction. An address delivered before the Oxford University Nonconformist Union (James Thornton, Oxford, 1882 )
 Inspiration and the Bible: An Inquiry (T.F. Unwin, 1889)
 The Book of Proverbs (Expositor's Bible series, 1891)
 Verbum Dei: The Yale Lectures on Preaching (Macmillan & Co New York, 1893)
 Alfred Tennyson: A Saintly Life (London J.M. Dent & Co; New York E.F. Dutton & Co, 1900)
 The Springs of Joy and Other Sermons (Fleming H. Revell Company, 1900)
 The Bible: A Missionary Book (Oliphant, Anderson & Ferrier, Edinburgh and London, 1904)
 The Early Church (Hodder & Stoughton New York, 1909)
 Great Issues (New York The Macmillan Company, 1909)
 "The Teaching of Jesus" (Isbister and Company Limited 1895)
 "Woman of The Old Testament"
   "Studies in Womanhood"
(James Nisbet & Co, Limited 1904)

References

External links
 Robert Forman Horton photographs at the National Portrait Gallery
 

1855 births
1934 deaths
Clergy from London
People educated at Shrewsbury School
Presidents of the Oxford Union
Alumni of New College, Oxford
Congregationalism
English Congregationalist ministers
Academics from London
English theologians